Marcata is an album by Irish rock band The Minutes. It was released on 20 May 2011 through Model Citizen Records.

In its first week of release, the album peaked at number 16 in the official Irish Albums Chart.

Track listing
All songs written by The Minutes.

Singles

Personnel
 Mark Austin - Lead vocals and rhythm guitar
 Tom Cosgrave - Bass and backing vocals
 Shane Kinsella - Drums and backing vocals

References

2011 debut albums
The Minutes albums
Rubyworks Records albums